The abbreviation MSSR can refer to various concepts:
 The  Molecular Screening Shared Resource (2004-Present), a facility at the University of California, Los Angeles, Dedicated to High-throughput_screening.
 The  Moldavian Soviet Socialist Republic (1940-1991), a constituent republic of the Soviet Union.
 A Monopulse Secondary Surveillance Radar, an advanced secondary surveillance radar.
 The Marine Scout Sniper Rifle, a sniper rifle developed by the Philippine Marine Corps.